Apterichtus orientalis is a species of snake eel native to the northwestern Pacific Ocean where it is known only from the Kii Peninsula in western Japan.  It can be found at depths of from  where it occurs on substrates of sand or mud.  It can reach a length of  TL (measured from a female specimen).

Etymology
The species epithet "orientalis" is derived from the word "Oriental", a reference to this species being found in the Far East, which in turn derives from the Latin "oriens" (rising).

References

Fish described in 1994
orientalis